Gerda Staniek (née Schilling; 8 February 1925 – 1985) was an Austrian athlete. She competed in the women's javelin throw at the 1948 Summer Olympics and the 1952 Summer Olympics.

References

External links
  

1925 births
1985 deaths
Athletes (track and field) at the 1948 Summer Olympics
Athletes (track and field) at the 1952 Summer Olympics
Austrian female javelin throwers
Olympic athletes of Austria
Place of birth missing